List of notable Australian sportswomen. List is based on their inclusion into the Sport Australia Hall of Fame, Olympic and Paralympic individual gold medalist, multiple individual medalist at Olympic Games and world championships or recognized through public opinion lists. The list is not exhaustive.

Athletics
Judy Amoore - Olympic Games individual medalist and Sport Australia Hall of Fame inductee
Raelene Boyle -  multiple Olympic medalist and Sport Australia Hall of Fame inductee
Maureen Caird - Olympic Games gold medalist and Sport Australia Hall of Fame inductee
Betty Cuthbert -  multiple Olympic gold medalist and Sport Australia Hall of Fame inductee
Shirley de la Hunty - multiple Olympic gold medalist and Sport Australia Hall of Fame inductee
Jane Flemming - multiple Commonwealth Games gold medalist
Debbie Flintoff-King - Olympic gold medalist and Sport Australia Hall of Fame inductee
Cathy Freeman - Olympic gold medalist and Sport Australia Hall of Fame inductee
Tracey Freeman - - multiple Paralympic Games gold medalist
Marjorie Jackson -  multiple Olympic gold medalist and Sport Australia Hall of Fame inductee
Pam Kilborn - multiple Olympic Games individual medalist and Sport Australia Hall of Fame inductee
Lisa Llorens - multiple Paralympic Games gold medalist
Marlene Mathews - multiple Olympic medalist and Sport Australia Hall of Fame inductee
Lisa McIntosh - multiple Paralympic Games gold medalist
Decima Norman - multiple Commonwealth Games gold medalist and Sport Australia Hall of Fame inductee
Glynis Nunn - Olympic gold medalist and Sport Australia Hall of Fame inductee
Lisa Ondieki - Olympic Games individual medalist and Sport Australia Hall of Fame inductee
Sally Pearson - Olympic games gold medalist
Alison Quinn -  multiple Paralympic Games gold medalist
Louise Sauvage - multiple Paralaympic Games gold medalist and Sport Australia Hall of Fame inductee
Donna Smith  - multiple Paralympic Games gold medalist
Katrina Webb -  multiple Paralympic Games gold medalist
Jodi Willis - multiple Paralympic Games gold medalist
Amy Winters - multiple Paralympic Games gold medalist

Basketball

Suzy Batkovic - multiple Olympic Games medalist
Sandy Brondello - multiple Olympic Games medalist
Donna Burns - gold medalist at 1992 Paralympic Games for Persons with Mental Handicap
Trisha Fallon -  multiple Olympic Games medalist
Kristi Harrower - multiple Olympic Games medalist
Lauren Jackson - multiple Olympic Games medalist and three-time WNBA MVP; 2021 inductee of the Naismith Memorial Basketball Hall of Fame
Erin Phillips - Olympic Games medalist and multiple FIBA World Cup medalist; also two-time MVP of AFL Women's in Australian rules football
Rachael Sporn - multiple Olympic Games medalist 
Penny Taylor - multiple Olympic Games medalist
Liesl Tesch - multiple Paralympic medalist and gold medalist in sailing.
Michele Timms - multiple Olympic Games medalist and Sport Australia Hall of Fame inductee

Canoeing

Katrin Borchert - multiple Olympic medalist
Jessica Fox - Olympic Games gold medalist 
Anna Wood - multiple Olympic medalist
Danielle Woodward - Olympic Games medalist

Cricket

Belinda Clark - former captain and Sport Australia Hall of Fame inductee
Ellyse Perry - dual international cricket and football
Karen Rolton - former leading batsman
Lisa Sthalekar - former leading all rounder
Betty Wilson former leading batsman and Sport Australia Hall of Fame inductee

Cycling

Sara Carrigan - Olympic Games gold medalist
Michelle Ferris - multiple Olympic Games medalist
Anna Meares - multiple Olympic Games gold medalist
Kathy Watt - Olympic gold medalist and Sport Australia Hall of Fame inductee

Diving

Brittany Broben - Olympic Games individual medallist
Jenny Donnet - multiple Commonwealth Games gold medalist
Chantelle Newbery - Olympic Games gold medalist
Loudy Wiggins - multiple Olympic Games medalist 
Melissa Wu - multiple Olympic Games medalist

Equestrian

Julie Higgins - multiple Paralympic Games gold medalist
Gillian Rolton - Olympic Games gold medalist and Sport Australia Hall of Fame inductee
Wendy Schaeffer - Olympic Games gold medalist and Sport Australia Hall of Fame inductee

Golf

Edwina Kennedy - Sport Australia Hall of Fame inductee
Jan Stephenson - Sport Australia Hall of Fame and World Golf Hall of Fame inductee
Karrie Webb – winner of multiple women's major championships and World Golf Hall of Fame inductee
Leonara Wray - Sport Australia Hall of Fame inductee

Gymnastics

Lauren Mitchell - World champion gold medalist
Monette Russo - World champion medalist

Hockey

Alyson Annan - multiple Olympic Games gold medalist and Sport Australia Hall of Fame inductee
Sharon Buchanan - Olympic Games gold medalist and  Sport Australia Hall of Fame inductee
Diane Gorman - former captain and Sport Australia Hall of Fame inductee
Rechelle Hawkes - multiple Olympic gold medalist and Sport Australia Hall of Fame inductee 
Jacqueline Pereira - multiple Olympic gold medalist and Sport Australia Hall of Fame inductee 
Nova Peris - Olympic Games gold medalist and Commonwealth Games gold medalist in athletics 
Liane Tooth - multiple Olympic Games gold medalist and Sport Australia Hall of Fame inductee

Horse racing

Gai Waterhouse - leading Australian trainer

Motor sport
Amanda Sparks - leading Australian driver
Leanne Tander - leading Australian driver

Lacrosse
Jen Adams - world champion, NCAA Lacrosse legend
Hannah Nielsen - world champion
Wendy Piltz - world champion
Jenny Williams - world champion

Netball

Margaret Caldow - Sport Australia Hall of Fame inductee   
Jane Cowan -  Sport Australia Hall of Fame inductee  
Michelle den Dekker - leading defender, World and Commonwealth Games champion, longest reigning Captain, elite coach
Liz Ellis - leading defender and Sport Australia Hall of Fame inductee  
Sharelle McMahon - leading Australian shooter
Anne Sargeant - leading goal shooter and Sport Australia Hall of Fame inductee 
Vicki Wilson - leading goal shooter and Sport Australia Hall of Fame inductee

Polocrosse
Kylie Dowling - Western Australian, polocrosse rider

Rowing

Kim Crow - Olympic Games multiple medalist
Adair Ferguson - Sport Australia Hall of Fame inductee
Megan Marcks - Olympic Games gold medalist and Sport Australia Hall of Fame inductee
Kate Slatter - Olympic Games gold medalist and Sport Australia Hall of Fame inductee

Sailing

Jenny Armstrong - Olympic Games gold medalist
Kay Cottee - Sport Australia Hall of Fame inductee
Tessa Parkinson - Olympic Games gold medalist
Elise Rechichi - Olympic Games gold medalist
Belinda Stowell - Olympic Games gold medalist
Liesl Tesch - Paralympic Games gold medalist

Shooting

Suzanne Balogh - Olympic Games gold medalist
Libby Kosmala - Multiple Paralympic Games gold medalist
Judith Trim - Sport Australia Hall of Fame inductee

Skiing
Torah Bright - Olympic Games gold medalist
Alisa Camplin - Olympic Games gold medalist and Sport Australia Hall of Fame inductee
Jacqui Cooper - world champion
Lydia Lassila - Olympic Games gold medalist
Kirstie Marshall - world champion and Sport Australia Hall of Fame inductee 
 Anna Segal - Olympic freestyle skier and two-time world champion
Zali Steggall - Olympic Games medalist and Sport Australia Hall of Fame inductee

Soccer

 Melissa Barbieri - former Australian captain
 Ashley Brown - player for Melbourne Victory
 Sam Kerr – current Australia captain; all-time leading goal scorer for the W-League and the US National Women's Soccer League; two-time NWSL MVP
Melissa Maizels (born 1993) - footballer
 Julie Murray - early professional pioneer
 Ellyse Perry - dual international cricket and football
 Cheryl Salisbury - former Australian captain
 Kyah Simon - first Aboriginal Australian footballer to score a goal at a World Cup final
 Sarah Walsh

Softball

Joyce Lester - Sport Australia Hall of Fame inductee
Marjorie Nelson - Sport Australia Hall of Fame inductee

Squash
Vicki Cardwell - multiple British Open and Sport Australia Hall of Fame inductee
Sarah Fitz-Gerald - multiple world champion and Sport Australia Hall of Fame inductee 
Michelle Martin - multiple world champion and Sport Australia Hall of Fame inductee  
Heather McKay -  multiple British Open and Sport Australia Hall of Fame inductee

Surf life saving
Reen Corbett - former Australian champion
Karla Gilbert - former Australian champion

Surfing

Layne Beachley - multiple world champion and Sport Australia Hall of Fame inductee
Wendy Botha - multiple world champion 
Pam Burridge - world champion and Sport Australia Hall of Fame inductee
Stephanie Gilmore - multiple world champion

Swimming

Cate Campbell – multiple individual medalist at Olympic Games and world championships
Melissa Carlton - multiple Paralympic Games gold medalist
Ellie Cole - multiple Paralympic Games gold medalist
Priya Cooper - multiple Paralympic Games gold medalist
Alicia Coutts - multiple Commonwealth Games gold medalist
Lorraine Crapp - Olympic Games gold medalist and Sport Australia Hall of Fame inductee
Anne Currie - multiple Paralympic Games gold medalist
Lisa Curry-Kenny
Gemma Dashwood - multiple Paralympic Games gold medalist
Clare Dennis - Olympic Games gold medalist and Sport Australia Hall of Fame inductee
Fanny Durack - Olympic Games gold medalist and Sport Australia Hall of Fame inductee
Elizabeth Edmondson - multiple Paralympic Games gold medalist
Michelle Ford - Olympic Games gold medalist and Sport Australia Hall of Fame inductee
Dawn Fraser - multiple Olympic Games gold medalist and Sport Australia Hall of Fame inductee
Tracey Freeman - multiple Paralympic Games gold medalist
Jacqueline Freney - multiple Paralympic Games gold medalist
Shane Gould - multiple Olympic Games gold medalist and Sport Australia Hall of Fame inductee
Jodie Henry - multiple Olympic Games gold medalist 
Daphne Hilton - multiple Paralympic Games gold medalist
Liesel Jones -  multiple Olympic Games gold medalist 
Annette Kellerman - Sport Australia Hall of Fame inductee
Ilsa Konrads - Commonwealth Games gold medalist and Sport Australia Hall of Fame inductee
Hayley Lewis - multiple Olympic Games medalist and Sport Australia Hall of Fame inductee 
Libby Lenton - multiple Olympic Games gold medalist 
Lyn McClements - Olympic Games gold medalist and Sport Australia Hall of Fame inductee
Emma McKeon – multiple Olympic Games gold medalist
Kaylee McKeown – multiple Olympic Games gold medalist
Bonnie Mealing - Olympic Games medalist and Sport Australia Hall of Fame inductee
Karen Moras - multiple Commonwealth Games gold medalist and Sport Australia Hall of Fame inductee 
Gail Neall - Olympic Games gold medalist and Sport Australia Hall of Fame inductee
Susan O'Neill - multiple Olympic Games gold medalist and Sport Australia Hall of Fame inductee
Siobhan Paton - multiple Paralympic Games gold medalist
Stephanie Rice - multiple Olympic Games gold medalist 
Jessica Schipper - multiple world champion
Emily Seebohm – multiple individual medalist at Olympic Games and world championships
Petria Thomas - multiple Olympic Games gold medalist and Sport Australia Hall of Fame inductee
Ariarne Titmus – multiple Olympic Games gold medallist
Beverley Whitfield - Olympic Games gold medalist and Sport Australia Hall of Fame inductee
Tracey Wickham - multiple world champion and Sport Australia Hall of Fame inductee  
Mina Wylie - Olympic Games medalist and Sport Australia Hall of Fame inductee

Taekwondo
Lauren Burns - Olympic Games gold medalist

Tennis

Ashleigh Barty – multiple grand slam champion and two-time year-end world #1 player
Lesley Bowrey - multiple grand slam champion and Sport Australia Hall of Fame inductee
Margaret Court - multiple grand slam champion and Sport Australia Hall of Fame inductee
 Eva Duldig (born 1938) - Austrian-born Australian and Dutch tennis player, author
Evonne Goolagong - multiple grand slam champion and Sport Australia Hall of Fame inductee
Sam Stosur - grand slam champion

Triathlon
Emma Carney - world champion
Jackie Gallagher - world champion
Nicole Hackett - world champion
Loretta Harrop - Olympic Games medalist and world champion
Michellie Jones - Olympic medalist and world champion
Joanne King - world champion
Emma Moffatt - Olympic medalist and world champion
Emma Snowsill - Olympic gold medalist and world champion

Volleyball
Natalie Cook - Olympic gold medalist beach volleyball
Kerri Pottharst - Olympic gold medalist beach volleyball

Water polo
Debbie Watson - Olympic gold medalist and Sport Australia Hall of Fame inductee

See also
List of Australian sportsmen

References

External links
Sport Australia Hall of Fame Athlete Members
List of South Australian sportswomen